Crossed Signals is a 1926 American silent action film directed by J.P. McGowan and starring Helen Holmes, Henry Victor and Georgie Chapman.

Cast
 Helen Holmes as Helen Wainwright 
 Henry Victor as Jack McDermott 
 Georgie Chapman as Overland Ike 
 William Lowery as George Harvey 
 Milla Davenport as Mother Slattery 
 Nelson McDowell as Mike Bradley 
 Clyde McAtee as T.P. Steele
 Slim Whitaker as Henchman

uncredited 
Charlotte Greenwood as Mother with baby at train station

References

Bibliography
 Munden, Kenneth White. The American Film Institute Catalog of Motion Pictures Produced in the United States, Part 1. University of California Press, 1997.

External links

1926 films
1920s action films
American action films
Films directed by J. P. McGowan
American silent feature films
Rayart Pictures films
1920s English-language films
1920s American films
Silent action films